Ponnapuram Kotta is a 1973 Indian Malayalam-language period drama film directed and produced by Kunchacko and written by N. Govindankutty. The film stars Prem Nazir, Vijayasree, Kaviyoor Ponnamma, K. P. A. C. Lalitha and Adoor Bhasi. The film had musical score and songs composed by G. Devarajan.

Cast

Prem Nazir
Vijayasree
Kaviyoor Ponnamma
KPAC Lalitha
Adoor Bhasi
Thikkurissy Sukumaran Nair
Manavalan Joseph
Adoor Pankajam
Alummoodan
Aranmula Ponnamma
G. K. Pillai
Rajasree
K. P. Ummer
N. Govindankutty
Premji
S. P. Pillai
Sabnam
Vijayanirmala

Soundtrack
The music was composed by G. Devarajan with lyrics by Vayalar and A. P. Gopalan.

Filming
Most of scenes were filmed in Gavi, Pathanamthitta, and inside the forest also. While filming a scene in the film where Vijayasree was bathing in the waterfalls, her dress slipped revealing her nipples. The scene was used in the film without her knowledge.

References

External links
 

1973 films
1970s Malayalam-language films